Pembroke College may refer to:

Pembroke College, Cambridge
Pembroke College, Oxford
Pembroke College (Brown University), the former women's college
University of North Carolina at Pembroke, formerly known as Pembroke State College

See also
Pembroke University, fictional setting for Netflix series The Chair, referred to in some sources as Pembroke College
 Pembroke School (disambiguation)

no:Pembroke College